Thunderhead is a wooden roller coaster located at Dollywood amusement park in Pigeon Forge, Tennessee. Manufactured by Great Coasters International, the ride opened on April 3, 2004, as the anchor attraction of a new section added to the park that season called Thunderhead Gap. Thunderhead features 22 turns and 32 crossovers, and utilizes GCI's Millennium Flyer trains, which have been used on all GCI coasters since 1999.

History
On June 26, 2003, Dollywood unveiled plans for a third coaster addition to the park called Thunderhead for the 2004 season, following Tennessee Tornado, which opened in 1999. Thunderhead officially opened to the public on April 3, 2004.

The ride was named after Thunderhead Mountain, a peak within the nearby Great Smoky Mountains National Park that was heavily logged during the early 19th century. Thunderhead is a slang term in the American South for Cumulonimbus clouds.

Ride experience
The train exits the station and turns right. From there, it makes its way through a left turn and climbs the  chain lift hill. Riders go through a right-handed banked turn after the drop. This is followed by a left-handed curve. Next, the train approaches a right turn, heading towards an on-ride camera, which takes photos of the riders. After a 180-degree right turn, riders go through a fly-through station element while traveling . It then goes through a left-handed curve. A smaller airtime hill leads to a 270-degree helix. Riders then go through a right turn and a left turn before hitting the brakes. The train slowly turns 90 degrees to the right, passing by the transfer track. This is followed by a 180-degree left turn that leads back to the station, where riders exit the train.

Construction data
700,000 board feet of Southern Yellow Pine
3600 yards of concrete
250,000 bolts
2,000,000 screws
185,000 feet of steel rebar

Rankings

Gallery

External links
Dollywood's Official Page for Thunderhead

References 

Roller coasters in Tennessee
Dollywood
Roller coasters operated by Herschend Family Entertainment